Boyne River is a stream in Northern Michigan, named for the River Boyne in Leinster, Ireland. Boyne River is Lake Charlevoix's second-largest tributary, after the Jordan River.

Course 

The South Branch flows northwest across the northeast corner of Warner Township in Antrim County.

Impoundments 
The river system has three major impoundments:
 The Boyne City Mill Pond within the Boyne City limits less than a mile from the river's mouth. The Boyne City Mill Pond is not a true impoundment resulting from a dam on the river, but affects the river similarly in that itcollects sediments and provides a large surface area that tends to raise the water temperature during the summer months. The pond is called "Little Lake" in a 1901 plat book.
The dam was built about 1906 to provide power to nearby towns. The Boyne River Power Company was consolidated with many other small power providers in west Michigan to form the Michigan Public Service Company in 1927. Consumers Energy bought that company in 1950 and continued to operate the power plant until October 12, 1962, after which the generating equipment was removed and the dam, buildings and land surrounding the reservoir were sold to the Boyne Mountain Lodge in 1963. In 1982, the Boyne Mountain Resort received a license to operate a 250 kilowatt hydroelectric generator using the existing dam and  reservoir.
The dam was built before 1900 and the water flow powered a saw mill and grist mill. M-75 crosses the river over the dam.

The soils surrounding Boyne River's headwaters are primarily composed of a Kalkaska-Leelanau association (a mixture of Kalkaska and Leelanau sands), and tend to form steep riverbanks. Among the fish species living in Boyne River are chinook salmon, walleye, brook trout, brown trout, and rainbow trout.

Tributaries 
 (right) Forest Lake, identified as Mud Lake in a 1901 plat book
 (left)  North Branch Boyne River
 (left) Schoolhouse Creek
 (right) Cramer Creek
 (right) Licks Creek
 (right) Kuznick Creek
 (right) South Branch Boyne River
 (right) Moyer Creek

Drainage basin 
The Boyne River system drains all or portions of the following cities, townships, and villages:
 Antrim County
 Warner Township
 Charlevoix County
 Boyne Valley Township
 Evangeline Township
 Hudson Township
 Melrose Township
 Wilson Township
 Otsego County
 Elmira Township
 Hayes Township

References

External links
 Michigan Department of Natural Resources - Fish Stocking Database
 Friends of the Boyne River

Rivers of Michigan
Rivers of Antrim County, Michigan
Rivers of Charlevoix County, Michigan
Rivers of Otsego County, Michigan
Tributaries of Lake Michigan